PATCO may refer to:

Professional Air Traffic Controllers Organization (1968), the defunct American labor union of air traffic controllers; famous for its failed 1981 strike
Professional Air Traffic Controllers Organization (2003), an independent labor union in the United States
Professional Air Traffic Controllers Organization (AFSCME), an affiliate of the American Federation of State, County and Municipal Employees (AFSCME)
PATCO Speedline, a rapid transit system running between Philadelphia, Pennsylvania and Camden County, New Jersey